Pieter Dirk "Pim" Jungerius (born 10 June 1933) is a Dutch physical geographer. He was a professor of physical geography, climatology and cartography at the University of Amsterdam between 1970 and 1998.

Life
Jungerius was born on 10 June 1933 in Rijnsburg. He obtained a degree in physical geography at the University of Amsterdam in 1957. Jungerius obtained his doctorate in physical geography in 1959 at the same university under  with a thesis titled: "Zur Verwitterung, Bodenbildung und Morphologie der Keuper-Liaslandschaft bei Moutfort in Luxembourg". He was lector of general physical geography and physical landscape geography at the University of Amsterdam between 1963 and 1970. He subsequently was professor of physical geography, climatology and cartography between 1970 and his retirement in 1998. 

In his research Jungerius has made links to geomorphology, soil science as well as social geography. Jungerius has made significant research into dune systems and the formation of cuesta. In 2012 he contributed to a large publication on earthen walls by the Rijksdienst voor het Cultureel Erfgoed. Jungerius has been a proponent of introducing legal protection for geological heritage.

Jungerius was elected a member of the Royal Netherlands Academy of Arts and Sciences in 1987.

References

1933 births
Living people
Members of the Royal Netherlands Academy of Arts and Sciences
People from Katwijk
Physical geographers
University of Amsterdam alumni
Academic staff of the University of Amsterdam